Zaenal Arief or Abo (born 3 January 1981) is an Indonesian retired professional footballer. He plays as a striker. He last played for Persepam MU in Indonesia Super League. He also played for Indonesia national football team. His younger brother, Yandi Munawar, is also a footballer who currently plays for Persib Bandung.

Club career

Persigar Garut
Arief started his career with his hometown club, Persigar Garut. He began his first team debut when he was 16 years old. Arief stayed with Persigar for one season.

Persib Bandung
In the 1998 season, he moved to Persib Bandung. He rarely played because he could not compete with the senior players. He had only played until the 1999 season.

Persita Tangerang
In summer 2000, he was signed by Persita Tangerang. At this club he was starting to get rations to play. He debuted as a major player at the age of 20. In 2002, aged 21, he got the call to play with the Indonesian national team. Arief, who is now labeled "Sudag Caps," began to demand by many clubs. He remained in Persita until 2006.

International goals

|}

References

External links
 
 http://www.persib.net/squad/zaenal-arif/

Indonesian footballers
1981 births
Living people
Indonesia international footballers
Persib Bandung players
Persita Tangerang players
Persisam Putra Samarinda players
Persikabo Bogor players
PSPS Pekanbaru players
Persepam Madura Utama players
Persela Lamongan players
Sundanese people
2007 AFC Asian Cup players
People from Garut
Association football forwards